The 2012  Netball Superleague season (known for sponsorship reasons as the FIAT Netball Superleague) was the seventh season of the Netball Superleague. The league was won by Northern Thunder. In the grand final Northern Thunder defeated Surrey Storm. 2012 saw the introduction of a new format, featuring three distinct phases, including a Showdown Weekend.

Teams 
Following the conclusion of the 2011 Netball Superleague season, England Netball decided to cut the number of teams from nine to eight and, as a result, Glasgow Wildcats lost their place in the league. In addition, Leeds Carnegie were re-branded as  Yorkshire Jets.

Regular season

Phase 1
Phase 1 featured all eight teams playing a single round of matches in a league format. At the end of the seven rounds, the top four and bottom four split into two tiers. Northern Thunder were unbeaten in Phase 1 of the season.

Phase 2
Phase 2 was effectively a group stage, with the teams in each group playing each other home and away.

Eliminator
The Eliminator was effectively a 4th/5th place play-off with the winner qualifying for the semi-finals.

Showdown Weekend
Semi Final 1 

Semi Final 2 

3rd/4th Place Play Off

Grand Final

References

 
2012
2012 in English netball
2012 in Welsh women's sport